Jake Norris (born 30 June 1999 in Ascot) is a British athlete, specialising in the hammer throw. He was the 2018 World U-20 (junior) champion.

His home club is Windsor, Slough Eton & Hounslow. He is trained by Paul Dickenson at Louisiana State University.

In June 2018 Norris competed at the England Athletics U23 and U20 Championships in Bedford and won with a British under-20 hammer record of 80.45m. By breaking the British record again with 80.65m throw in the 6 kg hammer, he won the title at the 2018 IAAF World Junior Championship in Tampere.

References

1999 births
Living people
British male hammer throwers
People from Ascot, Berkshire
LSU Tigers track and field athletes
World Athletics U20 Championships winners